Hold the Lion, Please is a 1942 Merrie Melodies cartoon, first released on June 6, 1942, distributed by the Vitaphone Corporation and Warner Bros. This is the first Bugs Bunny cartoon where the title does not refer "hare", "bunny", or "rabbit", the character's tenth appearance overall, and Chuck Jones' 39th Warner Bros. cartoon. Tedd Pierce handled writing duties, while Carl W. Stalling composed the music.

The title is a play on the expression used by switchboard operators of the day, asking the caller to "hold the line." The Three Stooges made a short with a similar title, Hold That Lion, which also featured a renegade lion.

Synopsis
The short focuses on a lion named Leo who's trying to prove he's still 'King of the Jungle' by hunting a small, defenseless animal.  He chooses Bugs Bunny as his intended victim, but Leo soon finds out that, in a battle of wits, he's the defenseless one. However, Leo eventually gets Bugs under one paw while raising the other one, claws extended, and looking extremely angry; a truly frightened-looking Bugs could be facing his end.

Just then, Leo's wife, Hortense, calls him on Bugs' phone, and Leo immediately goes from ferocious to meek. After a brief conversation, Leo tells her that he's on his way home. After hanging up the phone, Leo apologizes to Bugs about not being able to "stay and kill him," and dashes home to Hortense. Initially, Bugs makes fun of Leo for his submissiveness to his wife, but it's quickly shown that Bugs is just as submissive to his own wife, Mrs. Bugs Bunny (according to a sign behind her), whose presence sends her husband sheepishly slinking back into their rabbit hole. Mrs. Bunny then asks the viewer, "Who wears the pants in this family?" before lifting up her skirt to show her literally wearing a pair of pants.

Cast
 Mel Blanc as Bugs Bunny, Monkey, Giraffe, and Mrs. Bugs Bunny.
 Tedd Pierce as Leo the Lion.
 Robert C. Bruce as the Hippo.

References

External links

 

        

1942 films
1942 short films
1942 animated films
1940s animated short films
Merrie Melodies short films
Short films directed by Chuck Jones
Films scored by Carl Stalling
Bugs Bunny films
Animated films about lions
Films produced by Leon Schlesinger
1940s Warner Bros. animated short films